Gonave may refer to:
Gulf of Gonâve
Gonâve Island
Gonâve Microplate

See also
Gonaïves